Zachary James "Zach" Pangelinan (born June 16, 1988) is a rugby international for the United States and plays for the Houston SaberCats in Major League Rugby (MLR).

Pangelinan made his debut for the U.S. national rugby team on November 17, 2012 in the International Rugby Series, starting at fullback in place of the unavailable Chris Wyles.

Pangelinan was the leading scorer for the United States in that match with eight points. He played club rugby with OMBAC.

Pangelinan was born in Hagåtña, Guam, and formerly played soccer as a midfielder for Guam.

Football

Club career
Pangelinan played for Guam Shipyard Football Club, and won four Guam League titles between 2005 and 2006 with them. Previously, he was part of the Guam Under-18 team that won two league titles in 2004.

International career

Appearances
Debut in 2005 East Asian Cup
At least one appearance (out of four) at the 2005 East Asian Cup (scored a goal in one match)
Three appearances at the 2008 East Asian Cup (Does not count appearances (2) and goals (7) against Northern Mariana Islands as they were not 'A' international matches)
Three appearances at the 2008 AFC Challenge Cup

Goals

Rugby union

Club career
Pangelinan played his club rugby for OMBAC. On January 9, 2013 he was awarded the RugbyMag.com Player of the Week prize for his match-winning performance against Los Angeles.

International career
In addition to Pangelinan's appearances for the USA Eagles, he has represented his native Guam in rugby.

In May 2013, he was one of five USA Eagles players chosen to represent a Bermuda International Select XV side in a challenge game with English Premiership side Saracens.

References

External links
 
 Zach Pangelinan at USA Rugby

1988 births
Living people
People from Hagåtña, Guam
Guamanian footballers
Guam international footballers
Guam Shipyard players
Houston SaberCats players
Association football midfielders
American rugby union players
United States international rugby union players
San Diego Breakers players
Rugby union wings
Rugby union fullbacks
Rugby union scrum-halves